Ellen Margaret Eaton, Baroness Eaton, DBE, DL (born 1 June 1942, Bradford, England) has been a Conservative Party life peer in the British House of Lords since 2010.

She has been a Councillor with Bradford Metropolitan Borough Council since 1986 and was the Chairman of the Local Government Association until June 2011.

Biography

Born as Ellen Margaret Midgley in 1942 to John and Evelyn (née Smith) Midgley, she attended Hanson Grammar School and the Balls Park Teacher Training College, where she achieved a Certificate in Education. She worked as a schoolteacher. In 1969, she married John Eaton, with whom she has a son and a daughter.

Political career
 Member, Bradford Metropolitan Borough Council, since 1986
 Leader of Conservative Group 1995–
 Council Leader 2000–06
 Former chair: Bradford Local Strategic Partnership Board, Bradford Cultural Consortium
 Former co-chair, Bradford Safer Communities Partnership; Director: Bradford Centre Regeneration Company, Leeds Bradford International Airport
 Member, Yorkshire and Humber Assembly 
 Local Government Association: Vice-chairman, Conservative Group, Chairman, Conservative Group, 2008–11
 Member, Committee of the Regions, 2003–06
 Deputy Lieutenant for West Yorkshire since 2008
 Chairman, Local Government Association, 2008–11

Affiliations
 Chairman and Trustee, Near Neighbours (national registered charity)  
 Trustee, Angelus Foundation (national registered charity for drugs education)
 Trustee, Cottingley Town Hall, Cottingley, Bradford, West Yorkshire
 Member, Common Sense Group as anti-"woke" group within the Conservative Party

Honours
 Officer of the Order of the British Empire (OBE) in the 2003 Birthday Honours.
 Dame Commander of the Order of the British Empire (DBE) in the 2010 New Year Honours
 Baroness Eaton, of Cottingley, in the County of West Yorkshire on 21 July 2010
 Honorary Doctor of Laws of the University of Bradford - December 2012

References

External links
BBC Democracy Profile 

1942 births
Living people
Councillors in Bradford
Conservative Party (UK) life peers
Life peeresses created by Elizabeth II
Dames Commander of the Order of the British Empire
Deputy Lieutenants of West Yorkshire
Date of birth missing (living people)
Schoolteachers from Yorkshire
Women councillors in England
Chairs of the Local Government Association